Law and Disorder is a British sitcom that aired on ITV in 1994. Starring Penelope Keith, it was written by Alex Shearer, who had also written No Job for a Lady, in which Keith also appears. It was directed and produced by John Howard Davies. Law and Disorder was made for the ITV network by Thames Television and Central Television.

Cast
Penelope Keith — Philippa Troy
Simon Williams — Gerald Triggs
Charles Kay — Judge Wallace
Eamon Boland — Arthur Bryant
John Junkin — Steven
Emma Davies — Susan

Plot
The main character in Law and Disorder was Philippa Troy, a widowed acid-tongued barrister, who used a no-nonsense, and sometimes illegal, approach to winning cases. She always won, often beating Gerald Triggs. Troy also wrote a series of children's books called Prickly Peter, and drove an open-top sports car. Other characters were her solicitor Arthur Bryant, clerk Steven, her junior Susan and the Judge.

Episodes
"What Goes Up" (17 January 1994)
"One for the Album" (24 January 1994)
"A Night to Remember" (31 January 1994)
"A Slip of the Pen" (7 February 1994)
"The Cannibal" (14 February 1994)
"Safe as Houses" (21 February 1994)

DVD releases 

The complete series of Law and Disorder was released on 5 May 2014 by Network.

References
Mark Lewisohn, "Radio Times Guide to TV Comedy", BBC Worldwide Ltd, 2003
British TV Comedy Guide for Law and Disorder

External links 
 

1990s British sitcoms
1994 British television series debuts
1994 British television series endings
ITV sitcoms
Television shows set in Surrey
Television series by Fremantle (company)
Television shows produced by Thames Television
English-language television shows